James Guidry (born March 12, 1967) is a former American football quarterback who played five seasons in the Arena Football League (AFL) with the Dallas Texans, Milwaukee Mustangs, Florida Bobcats, Anaheim Piranhas and Portland Forest Dragons. He played college football at Texas A&I University. He was also a member of the Detroit Drive.

Professional career

Detroit Drive
Guidry was a member of the Detroit Drive during the 1993 Arena Football League season.

Dallas Texans
Guidry was traded to the Dallas Texans in June 1993.

Milwaukee Mustangs
After playing in Europe for several years, Guidry signed with the Milwaukee Mustangs in April 1996.

Florida Bobcats
Guidry played for the Florida Bobcats in 1996.

Anaheim Piranhas
Guidry was traded to the Anaheim Piranhas in March 1997. He was released by the Piranhas in April 1997.

Portland Forest Dragons
Guidry played for the Portland Forest Dragons from 1998 to 1999. He recorded 87 touchdowns on 4,069 passing yards during his time with the Forest Dragons. His playing career ended when he was knocked unconscious after being blindsided in the end zone for a sack during a game on May 8, 1999. He spent six days in the hospital after the hit to his spinal cord and was partially paralyzed on his left side until undergoing surgery. Guidry was named the AFL's Most Inspirational Player of the Year in 1999.

References

External links
Just Sports Stats

Living people
1967 births
Players of American football from Texas
American football quarterbacks
African-American players of American football
Texas A&M–Kingsville Javelinas football players
Dallas Texans (Arena) players
Milwaukee Mustangs (1994–2001) players
Florida Bobcats players
Anaheim Piranhas players
Portland Forest Dragons players
Sportspeople from Beaumont, Texas
21st-century African-American people
20th-century African-American sportspeople